James L. Hurley is an American academic administrator who is currently the 16th President of Tarleton State University.

Education 
Hurley is a first generation college graduate. He holds a doctorate in educational leadership and finance from Morehead State University in Kentucky, a master’s degree in education from Indiana University, and a bachelor’s degree in business education and management from the University of Pikeville in Pikeville, Kentucky.

Academic career 
Prior to serving as president of Tarleton State, Hurley was named the President of University of Pikeville from 2013 to 2015, where he had received his bachelor's. He spent 11 years in the public education system before returning to UPIKE as executive vice president. Hurley was executive vice president and dean of business at Lincoln Memorial University from 2015 to 2017, and president of Tusculum University, a private university in Tennessee from 2017 to 2019.

President of Tarleton State 
Hurley was confirmed by the Texas A&M University System Board of Regents in August, 2019 and inaugurated in February, 2020. He succeeds President Emeritus Dr. F. Dominic Dottavio who retired from administration to return to teaching in the College of Agriculture & Environmental Sciences. Tarleton has its main campus in Stephenville, Texas, a satellite campus near Fort Worth off the Chisholm Trail Parkway, and offers degrees at locations in Bryan at The Texas A&M University System RELLIS Campus, Waco, Midlothian, and online.

Personal life 
Hurley and his wife, Kindall, have four children.

References 

American academic administrators
Year of birth missing (living people)
Living people